,  is about  from Ōita Station located in Bungo-ōno City within Ōita Prefecture, Japan. It is also referred to as Oitakenou Airfield and is classified as a General or Other Airport within Japan.

History
The airport opened in April 1992 and originally served as a means to transport agricultural products, produce, and crops by air from Ōita Prefecture. In 1997, the airport's name was changed to its current name, Oitakenou Airport, as the airport began to serve civil aviation functions.

Current activity
Oitakenou Airport currently services arrivals and departures of civil aviation (with prior notice and approval), sightseeing flights, and offers use of runway and hangar facilities for private pilots. In addition, the airport supports rescue and firefighting efforts throughout Kyushu island a Kawasaki BK 117 firefighting helicopter, called "Toyokaze", is stationed there.

Kyushu Airlines offers private chartered flights or sightseeing flights out of Oitakenou Airport.

In 2003, Nippon Bunri University (NBU) established the Oitakenou Airport NBU Extension Campus. The facility is used for NBU Aerospace Engineering Department students to gain practical knowledge and learn about the mechanics and engineering of airplane engines.

The Kenou Flying Club, founded in February 2004, operates out of the Oitakenou Airport. They utilize Cessna 172P or 172R airframes and conduct cross-country flights as well as offering orientation and training flights.

Facilities
The apron can support three commuter planes, six small planes (similar in size to Cessna 172), and one firefighting helicopter. There is one passenger terminal, a 290 square meter hangar, and a 500 square meter parking lot.

References

External links 

 Kenou Airport (in Japanese)
 Kyushu Airlines (in Japanese)
 Kenou Flying Club (in Japanese)
 Nippon Bunri University Aerospace Engineering Department (in Japanese)

Airports in Japan
Bungo-ōno, Ōita